Keeney is a surname that has roots largely in the Celtic Irish Tradition. The name has a range of spellings including: Kinne, Keen, Keene, Keane, Kane, Kayne, Keaney, Keny, Keeny, Keyne, O'Kane, O'Keane, O'Cahan, Cahan, Kean, Kinney, O'Cain, Ó Cianaigh, McClokey, McCluskey, McClaskey. The Ó prefix means the "grandson of."  The Ó Catháin clan also has relations to the O'Neill dynasty of Ulster.

As Roscoe C. Keeney, Jr. (1922 - 2012) self listed "Family Historian" notes on his website"Whether the spelling be KINNE or KEENE or KINNEY or KEENEY or KEENY or another favorite spelling, we claim the same ancestry."

"eeney" is a common Gaelic ending (note Sweeney or Feeney)

Currently, there are around 20,000 individuals with the name Keeney in the United States.

Author and artist, Rebekah (Voll) Keeney has noted in her book Cornell Cabin Stories that in the Penn State Creamery Hall of Fame Flavors there is a Keeney Beany. A double chocolate ice cream with chocolate chunks, which pays tribute to Professor Emeritus Philip Keeney, a nationally recognized teacher and scientist in ice cream and chocolate technology.

See also
19452 Keeney, a main-belt asteroid

References

External links
  Pre-American History of the Keeney Surname, by Bill Allen Keeney
 House of Names, Keeny family crest
 Ó Catháin pedigree and crests

Surnames